Leslie Charles Brian Croom (20 April 1920 – 20 December 1989) was an English cricketer.  Croom was a right-handed batsman who bowled right-arm off break.  He was born at Wybunbury, near Northwich, Cheshire.

Croom made his first-class debut for Warwickshire against Cambridge University at Fenner's in 1949.  He made three further first-class appearances in that season for the county, the last of which came against Lancashire at Edgbaston.  In his four first-class appearances, he scored a total of 73 runs at an average of 9.12, with a high score of 26.

He died at Dudley, Worcestershire, on 20 December 1989.  His father, Alfred, was also a first-class cricketer.

References

External links
Leslie Croom at ESPNcricinfo
Leslie Croom at CricketArchive

1920 births
1989 deaths
Sportspeople from Northwich
English cricketers
Warwickshire cricketers